The Northern Ireland Courts and Tribunals Service (Ulster-Scots: Norlin Airlan Coort Service) runs the courts of Northern Ireland. It is an agency of the Department of Justice for Northern Ireland. The Court of Judicature for Northern Ireland, county courts, magistrates’ courts, coroners’ courts and certain tribunals are all administered by the Courts and Tribunals Service. The NICTS employs approximately 830 staff members.

Prior to the devolution of justice matters to the Northern Ireland Assembly, the Northern Ireland Court Service was a separate legal entity under the Lord Chancellor, established in 1979 pursuant to the Judicature (Northern Ireland) Act 1978.

List of Northern Ireland Courts

Court of Judicature of Northern Ireland
Court of Appeal
High Court
Crown Court
Antrim
Armagh	
Ballymena	
Banbridge	
Coleraine	
Craigavon	
Downpatrick	
Dungannon	
Enniskillen	
Laganside - County Court, Crown Court, Magistrates Court
Limavady	
Lisburn	
Londonderry	
Magherafelt	
Newry	
Newtownards	
Omagh	
Strabane

See also
List of Government departments and agencies in Northern Ireland
Her Majesty's Courts Service
Scottish Courts and Tribunals Service

References

External links
Court Service website

Courts of Northern Ireland
Law of Northern Ireland
Government of Northern Ireland
Court administration